Re:Fashion is an American reality-TV series airing on TN Marketing's Craftsy. The series is hosted by actress Marcy Harriell, alongside husband Robert Harriell. The entertainment forward series follows her exploits as she takes clothing from her closet and off the rack that are 'not quite up to snuff', and turns them into unique fashion items that highlight her sensibilities.

Synopsis
Inspired by Marcy Harriell's alternate online persona, oonaballoona, Re:Fashion takes a peek behind the curtain and brings oona to live action. In each episode, she shares tips and ticks on how to refashion wardrobe, while encouraging viewers to find their distinct style and 'inner funkiness', often incorporating her husband's special blend of sewing insouciance to get to the final result. With an emphasis on having fun and embracing the 'technicolor' self, the Harriells' take viewers along for their adventures, and share fashion fails and triumphs along the way.

Production
Re:Fashion was created as one of the first entertainment forward productions of Bluprint after NBCUniversal acquired Craftsy and launched the new, over-the-top video platform.

Episodes
Source: IMDB

Series overview

Season 1 (2018)

Season 2 (2019)

Reception

Awards
Best Instructional Video - 2019 Cynopsis Awards

References

2010s American reality television series
2018 American television series debuts
English-language television shows
Television series by Bunim/Murray Productions
NBCUniversal